Heather Sheehan (born December 9, 1961) is an American artist who lives and works in Cologne, Germany. In her work, she combines elements of sculpture, installation, performance, video art  and black and white photography. Her work focuses on the development and presentation of individual mythologies.

Life and work
Sheehan studied at the Parsons School of Design and the New School of Social Research in New York. Until 1994, she lived and worked in New York City, after which she emigrated to Cologne.

The term Individual Mythology, originally coined by Harald Szeemann on the occasion of the documenta 5, denotes a mode in which artists create works from their subjective inner perception as these relate, in their mythological qualities, to recurring events in human life, such as birth, death, etc. It follows that these art installations have a puzzling effect on the viewer. The ambiguity of the presented impulses invites reflection by, and resonance within, the viewers themselves. Sheehan's main interest lies in the narrative interweaving of complex interrelationships. Through her use of varied media, she achieves a multi-dimensional world of experience in which everything relates to the given locations and her studies of them.

For the exhibition alighting (2015), for example, Sheehan produced a video entitled alighting on the river, which mirrors the two main themes in the history of the city of Augsburg, namely the textile manufacturing  and the river Lech, which flows through Augsburg. A woman in a plain dress walks barefoot, each step slow and deliberate, along a river bank. She wears a white kerchief and puts down under a willow, the coarse linen sack and black stone which she carried in her arms like a child or her own soul. Then, she turns her back to the viewer of the black-and-white video and steps into the water which soon reaches her thighs. Cut. The next scene shows nothing but water, the rushing river. The End. (in German: Eine Frau in einem schlichten Kleid geht barfuß, jeder Schritt langsam und tastend, an einem Flussufer entlang. Sie trägt ein weißes Kopftuch und legt unter einer Weide den Sack aus grobem Leinen und den schwarzen Stein ab, den sie wie ein Kind oder ihre Seele in den Armen trug. Dann dreht sie dem Betrachter des in Schwarz-Weiß gedrehten Videos den Rücken zu und schreitet ins Wasser, das ihr bald bis zu den Oberschenkeln reicht. Schnitt. Die nächste Einstellung zeigt nichts als Wasser, den dahinströmenden Fluss. Ende.)

The exhibition was opened by a performance in which Sheehan – encased in a hessian sack – crawls into the room to gradually free herself from this cover. The main part of the exhibition  was conceived around self-staged, photographic, self-portrait in black and white photography, in which she deals physically with themes such as birth, stillbirth, loss, healing and transformation.

For the exhibition Soulfood (2003) at the Fuhrwerkswaage in Cologne, she installed the ingredients for 2000 kg of rice pudding in triangular formation: two open cubes together with one hanging sack; ingredients not only  for a comfort food for children and adults, but essential to basic nutrition of large portions of the world's population:  […] she combines the purism of the empty, utilitarian space with the modern concept of minimalism to create the aura of a still life of motherly care. (in german: […] sie verbindet den Purismus des ausgeräumten Nutzraumes mit dem Minimalismus moderner Positionen zur Aura eines Stillebens mütterlicher Fürsorge.)

For  Visitors and other Beings  (2011) in Siegburg, Germany, Sheehan created beings - in varying sizes, from giants over two meters high, to tiny forms of existence which one instinctively wants to protect. Although these creatures are made of  textiles and seem like cuddly animals, on closer inspection they emerge rather as creepy and disturbingly alien. This impression is reinforced by the accompanying photographs: For this the artist took to the razor, partly removed the plush from the resin faces and partly formed it into hairstyles and eyebrows. Greatly enlarged, these panels are suggestive in their own way: The human figure seems to emerge from the plush toy. The observer becomes witness to a moulting process. (in german: Hierfür hat die Künstlerin zum Rasierer gegriffen und den Plüschstoff auf den Kunstharzgesichtern teilweise entfernt, teilweise zu Frisur und Augenbrauen geformt. In starker Vergrößerung wirken diese Tafeln auf ihre Weise suggestiv: Die menschliche Gestalt scheint aus der Plüschpuppe hervorzubrechen. Der Betrachter wird zum Zeugen eines Häutungsprozessses.)

For Under the Skin (2001), Sheehan conceived a kind of breeding station for the Lehmbruck Museum, in which entities, mutually isolated in transparent plastic, were nourished by tubes and investigated for apparently scientific purposes. They appeared soft and slimy, not entirely  finished, or still in the process of maturing. Additionally, she created a video entitled Single Opening, in which she appeared as Professor Dr. Nurse and explained that the creatures are the result of the recreation of a monotreme, which she calls Maboutae.  It possesses one great economic advantage: it has only one body opening and produces a special milk. She sarcastically caricatures them as an absurd research focus and our amateurish ideas about the possibility of genetic engineering and its economic advantages. (in German:Sarkastisch karikiert sie damit abseitige Forschungsschwerpunkte und unsere laienhaften Vorstellungen von den Möglichkeit der Gentechnik und deren ökonomischen Vorteilen.)

Like a kind of human seismograph, Sheehan senses energies of the rooms in which she works and exhibits. Based on them, she develops her installations and performances: There is a place of fertile tension between desire and consciousness, between looking out at the world and looking back in to the self. I go to this place to gather and form images, objects, actions and words. I meld with a material, until the physical experience sparks my practice. The actions I take are guided by this charge. In a state of heightened awareness, I sense the poignancy of a presence wanting to be manifested in my hands, asking to be born and shared. (in German: Es gibt einen Ort der fruchtbaren Spannung zwischen Wunsch und Bewusstsein, zwischen dem Blick auf die Welt und Retrospektive in das Selbst. Ich gehe an diesen Ort, um Bilder, Gegenstände, Handlungen nd Worte zu sammeln und zu bilden. Ich verschmelze mit dem Material, bis das physische Erleben meine Praxis anregt. Die Handlungen, die ich durchführe, sind davon bestimmt. In einem Stadium erhöhter Aufmerksamkeit fühle ich die Dringlichkeit einer Anwesenheit, die durch meine Hände manifestiert werden möchte, und darum bittet, geboren und vermittelt/geteilt zu werden.)

Collections
 Kunstmuseum Bonn, Germany
 Museum of Contemporary Art in Kraków, Poland
 Stadtmuseum Siegburg, Germany

Videography (selection) 
 1995: Performance: On Pink, 18′ 02″
 1999: Single Opening, 08′ 15″
 2003: Performance: Each&Every, 04′ 21″
 2015: Performance: Alighting on the River, 14′ 32″
 2015: Performance: Waterline/Receding, 05′ 11″
 2018: Performance: I shot myself in Augsburg, 01′ 07″
 2019: Burlap Poem video (2012–2019), 11′ 57″
 2021: Hers is a Story, 04′ 06″

Awards
 2015 - 2016 MacDowell Colony Colony Fellowship, United States
 2017 Guestartist at Schloss Plüschow, Germany

Solo exhibitions (selection)
 1995 On Pink (Performance), Hering Raum Bonn, Germany 
 1997: Universal Mother, Galerie Barbara Cramer, Bonn, Germany
 1997: Made for Arolsen (Installation), Museum Schloss Arolsen, Germany
 2000: Father, Pavillon Schloss Molsberg, Westerwald, Germany
 2000: Single Opening, (Videoperformance), Arthothek Cologne, Germany
 2003: Soulfood, Kunstraum Fuhrwerkswaage, Cologne, Germany
 2005: Each and Every (Videoperformance), Trinity Church Cologne, Germany
 2007: Nike & Co., Art Galerie Scheel, Morsum, Sylt, Germany
 2009: Heather Sheehan - Beings, Neue Galerie Landshut, Landshut, Germany
 2011: Visitors and other Beings, Stadtmuseum Siegburg, Siegburg, Germany 
 2012: Visitors, the Tall and the Small, Kunstverein Oerlinghausen, Oerlinghausen, Germany
 2014: (W)hole,  Selected Art Models, Cologne, Germany 
 2015: Barking the Willow, (Exhibition and Performance), Neue Galerie Landshut, Landshut, Germany
 2015: Alighting, (Exhibition, Video and Performance), Kunstverein Augsburg, Augsburg, Germany
 2017: Institutional, Paul-Clemen-Museum of the University of Bonn, Germany
 2018: I Shot Myself in Augsburg, (Exhibition and Performance), Claudia Weil Galerie, Friedberg, Germany
 2019: A weighing/Eine Wägung (Exhibition and Performance), Susanne Neuerburg Galerie, Hennef, Germany
 2021: Sharpless, Margaret, Milton Art Bank (MAB), Milton, Pennsylvania, United States

Group exhibitions (selection)
 1988: Not Out of Fashion (Performance), New York Public Theater, New York, USA
 1993: Die verlassenen Schuhe, Rheinisches Landesmuseum Bonn, Germany
 1999: Zwei Amerikaner in Aschaffenburg, Neuer Kunstverein Aschaffenburg, Germany 
 1999: Macht und Fürsorge, Trinity Church Cologne, Germany 
 2001: Unter der Haut - Transformationen des Biologischen in der zeitgenössischen Kunst, Lehmbruck Museum, Duisburg, Germany 
 2006: Diagnose [Kunst], Kunstmuseum Ahlen, Germany
 2007: Familybonds, Lehmbruck Museum, Duisburg, Germany
 2011: Nicht Für Sie, Kunstverein Passau, Passau and Große Rathausgalerie Landshut, Landshut, Germany
 2015: 25 Jahre Kunst im Stadtmuseum, Stadtmuseum Siegburg, Siegburg, Germany
 2016: Medicine in Art, Museum of Contemporary Art in Kraków, Poland
 2016: Restructured, Newlyn Art Gallery, England
2019: 5. Biennale Internationale d’art non objectif, Le Pont-de-Claix, France
2019: Schönheit!?, Galerie Gisela Clement, Bonn, Germany

References

Further reading

External links 
 website of the artist
 
 Heather Sheehan at kunstaspekte.de
 Heather Sheehan at artfacts.net
 An Interview with Performance Artist Heather Sheehan by Daulton Dickey

1961 births
American women sculptors
Living people
MacDowell Colony fellows
American installation artists
20th-century American artists
21st-century American artists
American performance artists
21st-century American women photographers
21st-century American photographers
20th-century American women artists